The Red Lion is a Grade II listed public house at 2 Duke of York Street, St James's, London, SW1.

It is on the Campaign for Real Ale's National Inventory of Historic Pub Interiors.

It was built in 1821.

References

External links
 

National Inventory Pubs
St James's
Buildings and structures completed in 1821
19th-century architecture in the United Kingdom
Grade II listed pubs in the City of Westminster
Fuller's pubs